Guillier is a surname. It may refer to:

Alejandro Guillier Álvarez (born 1953), Chilean sociologist, television and radio journalist and politician
Georges Guillier (1920–1983), French racing cyclist
Lucien Guillier (1926–2019), French Olympian, discus thrower, shot putter

See also
Guilliers (Breton: Gwiler-Porc'hoed), a commune in the Morbihan department of Brittany in north-western France